The 1975 New York Jets season was the 16th season for the team and the sixth in the National Football League. It began with the team trying to improve upon its 7–7 record from 1974 under head coach Charley Winner. The Jets failed to do so, and finished with a record of 3–11, the worst in franchise history at the time. Winner was fired after nine games and replaced with assistant Ken Shipp, who finished the season with a 1-4 mark. 

This would be the first of three consecutive 3–11 seasons, as they would repeat this win–loss record in 1976 and 1977. They tied the New England Patriots for last place in their division, the AFC East, but were awarded fourth place by virtue of their head-to-head sweep over the Patriots during the season.

The Jets’ pass defense surrendered 8.12 yards-per-attempt (including quarterback sacks), the second-most in NFL history.

One of the only bright spots was fullback John Riggins rushing for 1,000 yards in a season (1,005) becoming the first Jet runner to eclipse that mark. Riggins also broke the record for most yards rushing in a season by a New York Jet (breaking the previous record of 948 set by Matt Snell).

Offseason

Roster

Schedule

Standings

Notes

References

External links 
 1975 statistics

New York Jets seasons
New York Jets
New York Jets season
1970s in Queens